Drunken Peasants (DP) is an American social, popular culture, and political commentary podcast that started in January, 2014. The podcast was originally hosted by the mononymous Ben (aka. Benpai), TJ Kirk, Scotty Kirk. Paul Parkey, Jr. (aka. PaulsEgo) became the fourth host in 2016. As of February 2018, the podcast is hosted by Ben and William Berry (aka. Billy the Fridge), along with a rotating lineup of guest hosts. The podcast predominantly features the hosts commenting on video clips from the Internet, with YouTube videos from other YouTubers often being featured. 

The podcast gained attention after a video clip in which the podcast's hosts questioned media personality Milo Yiannopoulos resulted in the latter being accused of supporting pedophilia and hebephilia.

History 
Drunken Peasants podcast originally aired in 2014 as the No Bullshit Podcast. The show was co-created by Ben and TJ Kirk (known on YouTube as "The Amazing Atheist"). For the first +20 episodes the show did not have video but instead included only the voices of the hosts as they did the show.  The podcast also used guest hosts, with TJ Kirk's production support staffer and younger brother Scotty Kirk eventually becoming a full-time host. YouTuber Paul Parkey (known as PaulsEgo) became the fourth member of the podcast's permanent staff in 2016. In 2017 Billy the Fridge became the fifth regular host. As of January 2023, the podcast had produced 1132 episodes.

TJ Kirk announced the end of the Drunken Peasants on December 29, 2017 via his own YouTube channel and Twitter. On January 31, 2018, TJ Kirk announced that the show would continue with hosts Ben and Billy The Fridge.

Milo Yiannopoulos 
In January, 2016, media personality Milo Yiannopoulos was a guest of the show. During the 3-hour long episode Yiannopoulos said that sexual relationships between 13-year-old boys and adult men and women can "happen perfectly consensually", as some children are sexually and emotionally mature enough to consent to sex with adults. In February 2017 the politically conservative blog The Reagan Battalion posted on Twitter a segment of the Drunken Peasants episode. Following widespread criticism of Yiannopoulos's comments, he was removed from his position as a speaker at the Conservative Political Action Conference. In an interview with TJ Kirk on The Joe Rogan Experience, host Joe Rogan remarked to TJ Kirk that "Your podcast was the big podcast that kind of sunk Milo", to which Kirk commented that he had known what he had gotten himself into by inviting Yiannopoulos on the podcast, while also stating that the podcasts's impact on Yiannopoulos had been unintentional.

Format 
Generally, Drunken Peasants episodes are anywhere from two to three hours in length. In December 2017, the podcast announced that future episodes would air on Mondays and Thursdays. In June 2018, the podcast instead announced that going forward their shows would be on Tuesdays and Saturdays.

References

External links 
 

Comedy and humor podcasts
Video podcasts
2014 podcast debuts
YouTube channels launched in 2014
Commentary YouTubers
Entertainment-related YouTube channels
English-language YouTube channels
YouTube controversies